The 2015 Tameside Metropolitan Borough Council election took place on 7 May 2015 to elect members of Tameside Metropolitan Borough Council in England. This was on the same day as other local elections.

Results

Ashton Hurst ward

Ashton St. Michael's ward

Ashton Waterloo ward

Audenshaw ward

Denton North East ward

Denton South ward

Denton West ward

Droylsden East ward
Councillor Kieran Quinn died on Christmas Day 2017.

Droylsden West ward

Dukinfield ward

Dukinfield / Stalybridge ward

Hyde Godley ward

}

Hyde Newton ward

Hyde Werneth ward

Longdendale ward

Mossley ward
Idu Miah resigned after ten months in office, his seat was retained for Labour by Tafheen Sharif at the 2016 local elections.

St. Peters ward

Stalybridge North ward

Stalybridge South ward

References

2015 English local elections
May 2015 events in the United Kingdom
2015
2010s in Greater Manchester